Dungeons & Dragons (commonly abbreviated as D&D or DnD) is a fantasy tabletop role-playing game (RPG) originally designed by Gary Gygax and Dave Arneson. The game was first published in 1974 by Tactical Studies Rules, Inc. (TSR). It has been published by Wizards of the Coast (now a subsidiary of Hasbro) since 1997. The game was derived from miniature wargames, with a variation of the 1971 game Chainmail serving as the initial rule system. D&D publication is commonly recognized as the beginning of modern role-playing games and the role-playing game industry, and also deeply influenced video games, especially the role-playing video game genre.

D&D departs from traditional wargaming by allowing each player to create their own character to play instead of a military formation. These characters embark upon adventures within a fantasy setting. A Dungeon Master (DM) serves as the game's referee and storyteller, while maintaining the setting in which the adventures occur, and playing the role of the inhabitants of the game world, also referred to as non-player characters (NPCs). The characters form a party and they interact with the setting's inhabitants and each other. Together they solve dilemmas, engage in battles, explore, and gather treasure and knowledge. In the process, the characters earn experience points (XP) to rise in levels, and become increasingly powerful over a series of separate gaming sessions.

The early success of D&D led to a proliferation of similar game systems. Despite the competition, D&D has remained the market leader in the role-playing game industry. In 1977, the game was split into two branches: the relatively rules-light game system of basic Dungeons & Dragons, and the more structured, rules-heavy game system of Advanced Dungeons & Dragons (abbreviated as AD&D). AD&D 2nd Edition was published in 1989. In 2000, a new system was released as D&D 3rd edition, continuing the edition numbering from AD&D; a revised version 3.5 was released in June 2003. These 3rd edition rules formed the basis of the d20 System, which is available under the Open Game License (OGL) for use by other publishers. D&D 4th edition was released in June 2008. The 5th edition of D&D, the most recent, was released during the second half of 2014.

In 2004, D&D remained the best-known, and best-selling, role-playing game in the US, with an estimated 20 million people having played the game and more than US$1 billion in book and equipment sales worldwide. The year 2017 had "the most number of players in its history—12 million to 15 million in North America alone". D&D 5th edition sales "were up 41 percent in 2017 from the year before, and soared another 52 percent in 2018, the game's biggest sales year yet". The game has been supplemented by many pre-made adventures, as well as commercial campaign settings suitable for use by regular gaming groups. D&D is known beyond the game itself for other D&D-branded products, references in popular culture, and some of the controversies that have surrounded it, particularly a moral panic in the 1980s falsely linking it to Satanism and suicide. The game has won multiple awards and has been translated into many languages.

Play overview

Dungeons & Dragons is a structured yet open-ended role-playing game. It is normally played indoors with the participants seated around a tabletop. Typically, one player takes on the role of Dungeon Master (DM) while the others each control a single character, representing an individual in a fictional setting. When working together as a group, the player characters (PCs) are often described as a "party" of adventurers, with each member often having their own area of specialty which contributes to the success of the whole. During the course of play, each player directs the actions of their character and their interactions with other characters in the game. This activity is performed through the verbal impersonation of the characters by the players, while employing a variety of social and other useful cognitive skills, such as logic, basic mathematics and imagination. A game often continues over a series of meetings to complete a single adventure, and longer into a series of related gaming adventures, called a "campaign".

The results of the party's choices and the overall story line for the game are determined by the DM according to the rules of the game and the DM's interpretation of those rules. The DM selects and describes the various non-player characters (NPCs) that the party encounters, the settings in which these interactions occur, and the outcomes of those encounters based on the players' choices and actions. Encounters often take the form of battles with "monsters" – a generic term used in D&D to describe potentially hostile beings such as animals, aberrant beings, or mythical creatures. The game's extensive rules – which cover diverse subjects such as social interactions, magic use, combat, and the effect of the environment on PCs – help the DM to make these decisions. The DM may choose to deviate from the published rules or make up new ones if they feel it is necessary.

The most recent versions of the game's rules are detailed in three core rulebooks: The Player's Handbook, the Dungeon Master's Guide and the Monster Manual.

The only items required to play the game are the rulebooks, a character sheet for each player, and a number of polyhedral dice. Many players also use miniature figures on a grid map as a visual aid if desired, particularly during combat. Some editions of the game presume such usage. Many optional accessories are available to enhance the game, such as expansion rulebooks, pre-designed adventures and various campaign settings.

Game mechanics

Before the game begins, each player creates their player character and records the details (described below) on a character sheet. First, a player determines their character's ability scores, which consist of Strength, Dexterity, Constitution, Intelligence, Wisdom, and Charisma. Each edition of the game has offered differing methods of determining these scores. The player then chooses a race (species), a character class (occupation, such as fighter, rogue, or wizard), an alignment (a moral and ethical outlook), and other features to round out the character's abilities and backstory, which have varied in nature through differing editions.

During the game, players describe their PCs' intended actions to the DM, who then describes the result or response. Trivial actions, such as picking up a letter or opening an unlocked door, are usually automatically successful. The outcomes of more complex or risky actions, such as scaling a cliff or picking a lock, are determined by rolling dice. Different polyhedral dice are used for different actions, such as a twenty-sided die to see whether a hit was made in combat, but an eight-sided die to determine how much damage was dealt. Factors contributing to the outcome include the character's ability scores, skills, and the difficulty of the task. In circumstances where a character is attempting to avoid a negative outcome, such as when dodging a trap or resisting the effect of a spell, a saving throw can be used to determine whether the resulting effect is reduced or avoided. In this case the odds of success are influenced by the character's class, levels and ability scores.

As the game is played, each PC changes over time and generally increases in capability. Characters gain (or sometimes lose) experience, skills and wealth, and may even alter their alignment or gain additional character classes. The key way characters progress is by earning experience points (XP), which happens when they defeat an enemy or accomplish a difficult task. Acquiring enough XP allows a PC to advance a level, which grants the character improved class features, abilities and skills. XP can be lost in some circumstances, such as encounters with creatures that drain life energy, or by use of certain magical powers that come with an XP cost.

Hit points (HP) are a measure of a character's vitality and health and are determined by the class, level and Constitution of each character. They can be temporarily lost when a character sustains wounds in combat or otherwise comes to harm, and loss of HP is the most common way for a character to die in the game. Death can also result from the loss of key ability scores or character levels. When a PC dies, it is often possible for the dead character to be resurrected through magic, although some penalties may be imposed as a result. If resurrection is not possible or not desired, the player may instead create a new PC to resume playing the game.

Adventures and campaigns

A typical Dungeons & Dragons game consists of an "adventure", which is roughly equivalent to a single story. The DM can either design an original adventure, or follow one of the many pre-made adventures (also known as "modules") that have been published throughout the history of Dungeons & Dragons. Published adventures typically include a background story, illustrations, maps and goals for PCs to achieve. Some include location descriptions and handouts. Although a small adventure entitled "Temple of the Frog" was included in the Blackmoor rules supplement in 1975, the first stand-alone D&D module published by TSR was 1978's Steading of the Hill Giant Chief, written by Gygax.

A linked series of adventures is commonly referred to as a "campaign". The locations where these adventures occur, such as a city, country, planet or an entire fictional universe, are referred to as "campaign settings" or "world". D&D settings are based in various fantasy genres and feature different levels and types of magic and technology. Popular commercially published campaign settings for Dungeons & Dragons include Greyhawk, Dragonlance, Forgotten Realms, Mystara, Spelljammer, Ravenloft, Dark Sun, Planescape, Birthright, and Eberron.

In addition to first-party campaigns and modules, two campaigns based on popular culture have been created. The first, based on Stranger Things, was released in May 2019. A campaign based on the Rick and Morty vs. Dungeons and Dragons comic book series was later released in November 2019.

Alternatively, DMs may develop their own fictional worlds to use as campaign settings.

Miniature figures

The wargames from which Dungeons & Dragons evolved used miniature figures to represent combatants. D&D initially continued the use of miniatures in a fashion similar to its direct precursors. The original D&D set of 1974 required the use of the Chainmail miniatures game for combat resolution. By the publication of the 1977 game editions, combat was mostly resolved verbally. Thus miniatures were no longer required for game play, although some players continued to use them as a visual reference.

In the 1970s, numerous companies began to sell miniature figures specifically for Dungeons & Dragons and similar games. Licensed miniature manufacturers who produced official figures include Grenadier Miniatures (1980–1983), Citadel Miniatures (1984–1986), Ral Partha, and TSR itself. Most of these miniatures used the 25 mm scale.

Periodically, Dungeons & Dragons has returned to its wargaming roots with supplementary rules systems for miniatures-based wargaming. Supplements such as Battlesystem (1985 and 1989) and a new edition of Chainmail (2001) provided rule systems to handle battles between armies by using miniatures.

Development history

Sources and influences

An immediate predecessor of Dungeons & Dragons was a set of medieval miniature rules written by Jeff Perren. These were expanded by Gary Gygax, whose additions included a fantasy supplement, before the game was published as Chainmail. When Dave Wesely entered the Army in 1970, his friend and fellow Napoleonics wargamer Dave Arneson began a medieval variation of Wesely's Braunstein games, where players control individuals instead of armies. Arneson used Chainmail to resolve combat. As play progressed, Arneson added such innovations as character classes, experience points, level advancement, armor class, and others. Having partnered previously with Gygax on Don't Give Up the Ship!, Arneson introduced Gygax to his Blackmoor game and the two then collaborated on developing "The Fantasy Game", the game that became Dungeons & Dragons, with the final writing and preparation of the text being done by Gygax. The name was chosen by Gygax's two-year-old daughter Cindy; upon being presented with a number of choices of possible names, she exclaimed, "Oh Daddy, I like Dungeons & Dragons best!", although less prevalent versions of the story gave credit to his then wife Mary Jo.

Many Dungeons & Dragons elements appear in hobbies of the mid-to-late 20th century. For example, character-based role playing can be seen in improvisational theater. Game-world simulations were well developed in wargaming. Fantasy milieux specifically designed for gaming could be seen in Glorantha's board games, among others. Ultimately, however, Dungeons & Dragons represents a unique blending of these elements.

The world of D&D was influenced by world mythology, history, pulp fiction, and contemporary fantasy novels. The importance of J. R. R. Tolkien's The Lord of the Rings and The Hobbit as an influence on D&D is controversial. The presence in the game of halflings, elves, half-elves, dwarves, orcs, rangers, and the like, as well as the convention of diverse adventurers forming a group, draw comparisons to these works. The resemblance was even closer before the threat of copyright action from Tolkien Enterprises prompted the name changes of hobbit to 'halfling', ent to 'treant', and balrog to 'balor'. For many years, Gygax played down the influence of Tolkien on the development of the game. However, in an interview in 2000, he acknowledged that Tolkien's work had a "strong impact" though he also said that the list of other influential authors was long.

The D&D magic system, in which wizards memorize spells that are used up once cast and must be re-memorized the next day, was heavily influenced by the Dying Earth stories and novels of Jack Vance. The original alignment system (which grouped all characters and creatures into 'Law', 'Neutrality' and 'Chaos') was derived from the novel Three Hearts and Three Lions by Poul Anderson. A troll described in this work influenced the D&D definition of that monster.

Other influences include the works of Robert E. Howard, Edgar Rice Burroughs, A. Merritt, H. P. Lovecraft, Fritz Leiber, L. Sprague de Camp, Fletcher Pratt, Roger Zelazny, and Michael Moorcock. Monsters, spells, and magic items used in the game have been inspired by hundreds of individual works such as A. E. van Vogt's "Black Destroyer", Coeurl (the Displacer Beast), Lewis Carroll's "Jabberwocky" (vorpal sword) and the Book of Genesis (the clerical spell 'Blade Barrier' was inspired by the "flaming sword which turned every way" at the gates of Eden).

Edition history

Dungeons & Dragons has gone through several revisions. Parallel versions and inconsistent naming practices can make it difficult to distinguish between the different editions.

Original game

The original Dungeons & Dragons, now referred to as OD&D, was a small box set of three booklets published in 1974. With a very limited production budget of only $2000—with only $100 budgeted for artwork—it was amateurish in production and assumed the player was familiar with wargaming. Nevertheless, it grew rapidly in popularity, first among wargamers and then expanding to a more general audience of college and high school students. Roughly 1,000 copies of the game were sold in the first year followed by 3,000 in 1975, and many more in the following years. This first set went through many printings and was supplemented with several official additions, such as the original Greyhawk and Blackmoor supplements (both 1975), as well as magazine articles in TSR's official publications and many fanzines.

Two-pronged strategy

In early 1977, TSR created the first element of a two-pronged strategy that would divide D&D for nearly two decades. A Dungeons & Dragons Basic Set boxed edition was introduced that cleaned up the presentation of the essential rules, made the system understandable to the general public, and was sold in a package that could be stocked in toy stores. Later in 1977, the first part of Advanced Dungeons & Dragons (AD&D) was published, which brought together the various published rules, options and corrections, then expanded them into a definitive, unified game for hobbyist gamers. TSR marketed them as an introductory game for new players and a more complex game for experienced ones; the Basic Set directed players who exhausted the possibilities of that game to switch to the advanced rules.

As a result of this parallel development, the basic game included many rules and concepts which contradicted comparable ones in AD&D. John Eric Holmes, the editor of the basic game, preferred a lighter tone with more room for personal improvisation. AD&D, on the other hand, was designed to create a tighter, more structured game system than the loose framework of the original game. Between 1977 and 1979, three hardcover rulebooks, commonly referred to as the "core rulebooks", were released: the Player's Handbook (PHB), the Dungeon Master's Guide (DMG), and the Monster Manual (MM). Several supplementary books were published throughout the 1980s, notably Unearthed Arcana (1985) that included a large number of new rules. Confusing matters further, the original D&D boxed set remained in publication until 1979, since it remained a healthy seller for TSR.

Revised editions

In the 1980s, the rules for Advanced Dungeons & Dragons and "basic" Dungeons & Dragons remained separate, each developing along different paths.

In 1981, the basic version of Dungeons & Dragons was revised by Tom Moldvay to make it even more novice-friendly. It was promoted as a continuation of the original D&D tone, whereas AD&D was promoted as advancement of the mechanics. An accompanying Expert Set, originally written by David "Zeb" Cook, allowed players to continue using the simpler ruleset beyond the early levels of play. In 1983, revisions of those sets by Frank Mentzer were released, revising the presentation of the rules to a more tutorial format. These were followed by Companion (1983), Master (1985), and Immortals (1986) sets. Each set covered game play for more powerful characters than the previous. The first four sets were compiled in 1991 as a single hardcover book, the Dungeons & Dragons Rules Cyclopedia, which was released alongside a new introductory boxed set.

Advanced Dungeons & Dragons 2nd Edition was published in 1989, again as three core rulebooks; the primary designer was David "Zeb" Cook. The Monster Manual was replaced by the Monstrous Compendium, a loose-leaf binder that was subsequently replaced by the hardcover Monstrous Manual in 1993. In 1995, the core rulebooks were slightly revised, although still referred to by TSR as the 2nd Edition, and a series of Player's Option manuals were released as optional rulebooks.

The release of AD&D 2nd Edition deliberately excluded some aspects of the game that had attracted negative publicity. References to demons and devils, sexually suggestive artwork, and playable, evil-aligned character types – such as assassins and half-orcs – were removed. The edition moved away from a theme of 1960s and 1970s "sword and sorcery" fantasy fiction to a mixture of medieval history and mythology. The rules underwent minor changes, including the addition of non-weapon proficiencies – skill-like abilities that originally appeared in 1st Edition supplements. The game's magic spells were divided into schools and spheres. A major difference was the promotion of various game settings beyond that of traditional fantasy. This included blending fantasy with other genres, such as horror (Ravenloft), science fiction (Spelljammer), and apocalyptic (Dark Sun), as well as alternative historical and non-European mythological settings.

Wizards of the Coast

In 1997, a near-bankrupt TSR was purchased by Wizards of the Coast. Following three years of development, Dungeons & Dragons 3rd edition was released in 2000. The new release folded the Basic and Advanced lines back into a single unified game. It was the largest revision of the D&D rules to date, and served as the basis for a multi-genre role-playing system designed around 20-sided dice, called the d20 System. The 3rd Edition rules were designed to be internally consistent and less restrictive than previous editions of the game, allowing players more flexibility to create the characters they wanted to play. Skills and feats were introduced into the core rules to encourage further customization of characters. The new rules standardized the mechanics of action resolution and combat. In 2003, Dungeons & Dragons v.3.5 was released as a revision of the 3rd Edition rules. This release incorporated hundreds of rule changes, mostly minor, and expanded the core rulebooks.

In early 2005, Wizards of the Coast's R&D team started to develop Dungeons & Dragons 4th Edition, prompted mainly by the feedback obtained from the D&D playing community and a desire to make the game faster, more intuitive, and with a better play experience than under the 3rd Edition. The new game was developed through a number of design phases spanning from May 2005 until its release. Dungeons & Dragons 4th Edition was announced at Gen Con in August 2007, and the initial three core books were released June 6, 2008. 4th Edition streamlined the game into a simplified form and introduced numerous rules changes. Many character abilities were restructured into "Powers". These altered the spell-using classes by adding abilities that could be used at will, per encounter, or per day. Likewise, non-magic-using classes were provided with parallel sets of options. Software tools, including player character and monster building programs, became a major part of the game. This edition added the D&D Encounters program; a weekly event held at local stores designed to draw players back to the game by giving "the busy gamer the chance to play D&D once a week as their schedules allow. In the past, D&D games could take months, even years, and players generally had to attend every session so that the story flow wasn't interrupted. With Encounters, players can come and go as they choose and new players can easily be integrated into the story continuity".

5th Edition 
On January 9, 2012, Wizards of the Coast announced that it was working on a 5th edition of the game. The company planned to take suggestions from players and let them playtest the rules. Public playtesting began on May 24, 2012. At Gen Con 2012 in August, Mike Mearls, lead developer for 5th Edition, said that Wizards of the Coast had received feedback from more than 75,000 playtesters, but that the entire development process would take two years, adding, "I can't emphasize this enough ... we're very serious about taking the time we need to get this right." The release of the 5th Edition, coinciding with D&Ds 40th anniversary, occurred in the second half of 2014.

Since the release of 5th edition, dozens of Dungeon & Dragons books have been published including new rulebooks, campaign guides and adventure modules. 2017 had "the most number of players in its history—12 million to 15 million in North America alone". Mary Pilon, for Bloomberg, reported that sales of 5th edition Dungeon & Dragons "were up 41 percent in 2017 from the year before, and soared another 52 percent in 2018, the game’s biggest sales year yet. [...] In 2017, 9 million people watched others play D&D on Twitch, immersing themselves in the world of the game without ever having to pick up a die or cast a spell". In 2018, Wizards of the Coast organized a massive live-stream event, the Stream of Many Eyes, where ten live-streamed sessions of Dungeons & Dragons were performed on Twitch over three days. This event won the Content Marketing Institute's 2019 award for best "In-Person (Event) Content Marketing Strategy". Dungeons & Dragons continued to have a strong presence on Twitch throughout 2019; this included a growing number of celebrity players and dungeon masters, such as Joe Manganiello, Deborah Ann Woll and Stephen Colbert. Wizards of the Coast has created, produced and sponsored multiple web series featuring Dungeons & Dragons. These shows have typically aired on the official Dungeons & Dragons Twitch and YouTube channels.

In 2020, Wizards of the Coast announced that Dungeons & Dragons had its 6th annual year of growth in 2019 with a "300 percent increase in sales of their introductory box sets, as well as a 65% increase on sales in Europe, a rate which has more than quadrupled since 2014". In terms of player demographics in 2019, 39% of identified as female and 61% identified as male. 40% of players are considered Gen Z (24 years old or younger), 34% of players are in the age range of 25–34 and 26% of players are aged 35+. In January 2021, the Los Angeles Times reported that according to Liz Schuh, head of publishing and licensing for Dungeons & Dragons, "revenue was up 35% in 2020 compared with 2019, the seventh consecutive year of growth," and in 2020, during the COVID-19 pandemic, "virtual play rose 86% [...] aided by online platforms such as Roll20 and Fantasy Grounds". Sarah Parvini, for the Los Angeles Times, wrote, "players and scholars attribute the game’s resurgent popularity not only to the longueurs of the pandemic, but also to its reemergence in pop culture—on the Netflix series Stranger Things, whose main characters play D&D in a basement; on the sitcom The Big Bang Theory; or via the host of celebrities who display their love for the game online". 

In September 2021, it was announced that a backwards compatible "evolution" of 5th edition would be released in 2024 to mark the 50th anniversary of the game. In August 2022, Wizards announced that the next phase of major changes for Dungeons & Dragons would occur under the One D&D initiative which includes a public playtest of the next version of Dungeons & Dragons and an upcoming virtual tabletop simulator with 3D environments developed with the Unreal Engine. Revised editions of the Player's Handbook, Monster Manual, and Dungeon Master's Guide are scheduled to be released in 2024.

In April 2022, Hasbro announced that Wizards would acquire the D&D Beyond digital toolset and game companion from Fandom; the official transfer to Wizards occurred in May 2022. At the Hasbro Investor Event in October 2022, it was announced that Dan Rawson, former COO of Microsoft Dynamics 365, was appointed to the newly created position of Senior Vice President for the Dungeons & Dragons brand; Rawson will act as the new head of the franchise. Dicebreaker highlighted that Rawson's role is "part of Wizards' plans to apply more resources to the digital side of D&D" following the purchase of D&D Beyond by Hasbro earlier in the year. Wizards of the Coast CEO Cynthia Williams and Hasbro CEO Chris Cocks, at a December 2022 Hasbro investor-focused web seminar, called the Dungeons & Dragons brand "under monetized". They highlighted the high engagement of fans with the brand, however, the majority of spending is by Dungeon Masters who are only roughly 20% of the player base. Williams commented that the increased investment in digital will "unlock the type of recurrent spending you see in digital games".

Following an apology issued by Wizards of the Coast for offensive and racist material included in Spelljammer: Adventures in Space and the announced revisions to the product in September 2022, Christopher Perkins – Wizards' game design architect – announced a new inclusion review process for the Dungeons & Dragons studio in November 2022. This process will now require "every word, illustration, and map" to be reviewed at several steps in development "by multiple outside cultural consultants prior to publication". The previous process only included cultural consultants at the discretion of the product lead for a project. All products being reprinted will also go through this new review process and be updated as needed.

Licensing

Early in the game's history, TSR took no action against small publishers' production of D&D compatible material, and even licensed Judges Guild to produce D&D materials for several years, such as City State of the Invincible Overlord. This attitude changed in the mid-1980s when TSR took legal action to try to prevent others from publishing compatible material. This angered many fans and led to resentment by the other gaming companies. Although TSR took legal action against several publishers in an attempt to restrict third-party usage, it never brought any court cases to completion, instead settling out of court in every instance. TSR itself ran afoul of intellectual property law in several cases.

With the launch of Dungeons & Dragonss 3rd Edition, Wizards of the Coast made the d20 System available under the Open Game License (OGL) and d20 System trademark license. Under these licenses, authors were free to use the d20 System when writing games and game supplements. The OGL has allowed a wide range of unofficial commercial derivative work based on the mechanics of Dungeons and Dragons to be produced since 2000; it is credited with increasing the market share of d20 products and leading to a "boom in the RPG industry in the early 2000s".

With the release of the fourth edition, Wizards of the Coast introduced its Game System License, which represented a significant restriction compared to the very open policies embodied by the OGL. In part as a response to this, some publishers (such as Paizo Publishing with its Pathfinder Roleplaying Game) who previously produced materials in support of the D&D product line, decided to continue supporting the 3rd Edition rules, thereby competing directly with Wizards of the Coast. Others, such as Kenzer & Company, returned to the practice of publishing unlicensed supplements and arguing that copyright law does not allow Wizards of the Coast to restrict third-party usage.

During the 2000s, there has been a trend towards reviving and recreating older editions of D&D, known as the Old School Revival. This in turn inspired the creation of "retro-clones", games which more closely recreate the original rule sets, using material placed under the OGL along with non-copyrightable mechanical aspects of the older rules to create a new presentation of the games.

Alongside the publication of the 5th Edition, Wizards of the Coast established a two-pronged licensing approach. The core of the 5th Edition rules have been made available under the OGL, while publishers and independent creators have also been given the opportunity to create licensed materials directly for Dungeons & Dragons and associated properties like the Forgotten Realms under a program called the DM's Guild. The DM's Guild does not function under the OGL, but uses a community agreement intended to foster liberal cooperation among content creators.

Wizards of the Coast has started to release 5th Edition products that tie into other intellectual properties—such as Magic: The Gathering with the Guildmasters' Guide to Ravnica (2018) and Mythic Odysseys of Theros (2020) source books. Two 5th Edition starter box sets based on TV shows, Stranger Things and Rick and Morty, were released in 2019. Source books based on Dungeons & Dragons live play series have also been released: Acquisitions Incorporated (2019) and Explorer's Guide to Wildemount (2020).

Between November and December 2022, there was reported speculation that Wizards was planning on discontinuing the OGL for Dungeons & Dragons based on unconfirmed leaks. In response to the speculation, Wizards stated in November 2022: "We will continue to support the thousands of creators making third-party D&D content with the release of One D&D in 2024." Limited details on the update to the OGL, including the addition of revenue reporting and required royalties, were released by Wizards in December 2022. Linda Codega, for Io9 in January 2023, reported on the details from a leaked full copy of the OGL 1.1 including updated terms such as no longer authorizing use of the OGL1.0. Codega highlighted that "if the original license is in fact no longer viable, every single licensed publisher will be affected by the new agreement. [...] The main takeaway from the leaked OGL 1.1 draft document is that WotC is keeping power close at hand". A week after the leak, Wizards issued a response which walked back several changes to the OGL; this response did not contain the updated OGL. The Motley Fool highlighted that "Hasbro pulled an abrupt volte-face and had its subsidiary D&D Beyond publish a mea culpa on its website". On January 27, 2023, following feedback received during the open comment period for the draft OGL1.2, Wizards of the Coast announced that the System Reference Document 5.1 (SRD 5.1) would be released under an irrevocable Creative Commons license (CC-BY-4.0) effective immediately and Wizards would no longer pursue deauthorizing the OGL1.0a.

 Reception 

Eric Goldberg reviewed Dungeons & Dragons in Ares Magazine #1 (March 1980), rating it a 6 out of 9, and commented that "Dungeons and Dragons is an impressive achievement based on the concept alone, and also must be credited with cementing the marriage between the fantasy genre and gaming." Eric Goldberg again reviewed Dungeons & Dragons in Ares Magazine #3 and commented that "D&D is the FRP game played most often in most places."

In the 1980 book The Complete Book of Wargames, game designer Jon Freeman asked, "What can be said about a phenomenon? Aside from Tactics II and possibly PanzerBlitz (the first modern tactical wargame), this is the most significant war game since H.G. Wells." However, Freeman did have significant issues with the game, pointing out, "On the other hand, beginning characters are without exception dull, virtually powerless, and so fragile they would fare poorly against a crippled mosquito—none of which exactly encourages newcomers." He also called the magic system "stupid", saying, "many of the spells are redundant, and the effects of the majority are hopelessly vague." He found essential elements such as saving throws, hit points, and experience points "undefined or poorly explained; the ratio of substance to "holes" compares unfavorably with the head of a tennis racquet." He also noted the rules were "Presented in the most illiterate display of poor grammar, misspellings, and typographical errors in professional wargaming." Despite all these issues, Freeman concluded "As it was given birth, it is fascinating but misshapen; in  its best incarnations, it's perhaps the most exciting and attractive specimen alive."  

The game had more than three million players around the world by 1981, and copies of the rules were selling at a rate of about 750,000 per year by 1984. Beginning with a French language edition in 1982, Dungeons & Dragons has been translated into many languages beyond the original English. By 1992, the game had been translated into 14 languages and sold over  copies in 44 countries worldwide. As many as six million people played the game in 2007.

Later editions would lead to inevitable comparisons between the game series. Griffin McElroy, for Polygon in 2014, wrote: "The game has shifted in the past four decades, bouncing between different rules sets, philosophies and methods of play. Role-playing, character customization and real-life improvisational storytelling has always been at the game's core, but how those ideas are interpreted by the game system has changed drastically edition-to-edition". Dieter Bohn, for The Verge in 2014, wrote: "Every few years there’s been a new version of D&D that tries to address the shortcomings of the previous version and also make itself more palatable to its age. [...] The third edition got a reputation (which it didn’t necessarily deserve) for being too complex and rules-focused. The fourth edition got a reputation (which it didn’t necessarily deserve) for being too focused on miniatures and grids, too mechanical. Meanwhile, the company that owns D&D had released a bunch of its old material for free as a service to fans, and some of that was built up into a competing game called Pathfinder. Pathfinder ultimately became more popular, by some metrics, than D&D itself". Bohn highlighted that the 5th Edition was "designed for one purpose: to bring D&D back to its roots and win back everybody who left during the edition wars". Henry Glasheen, for SLUG Magazine in 2015, highlighted that after jumping ship during the 4th Edition era he was drawn back to Dungeons & Dragons with 5th Edition and he considers it "the new gold standard for D20-based tabletop RPGs". Glasheen wrote "Fifth Edition is a compelling reason to get excited about D&D again" and "while some will welcome the simplicity, I fully expect that plenty of people will stick to whatever system suits them best. However, this edition is easily my favorite, ranking even higher than D&D 3.5, my first love in D&D".

Curtis D. Carbonell, in the 2019 book Dread Trident: Tabletop Role-Playing Games and the Modern Fantastic, wrote: "Negative association with earlier niche 'nerd' culture have reversed. 5e has become inclusive in its reach of players, after years of focusing on a white, male demographic. [...] At its simplest, the game system now encourages different types of persons to form a party not just to combat evil [...] but to engage in any number of adventure scenarios". Christian Hoffer, for ComicBook.com in 2022, highlighted the continuing fan debate on Dungeons & Dragons and Pathfinder's current editions which centers on Dungeons & Dragons 5th Edition's market dominance. Hoffer wrote, "the reality is that Dungeons & Dragons Fifth Edition is likely the most popular tabletop roleplaying game ever made, even more so than previous editions of the games. 5E has brought millions of new players to tabletop roleplaying games. Many of those newer players have never heard of other roleplaying games, even popular ones like Vampire: The Masquerade or Cyberpunk or Pathfinder. [...] Many content creators and publishers see 5E as their main path to survival and relevance even if it's not their preferred gaming system".

David M. Ewalt, in his book Of Dice and Men, praised that the game allows for a personal fantastical experience, and stated that "even though it's make-believe, the catharsis is real."

Acclaim

The various editions of Dungeons & Dragons have won many Origins Awards, including All Time Best Roleplaying Rules of 1977, Best Roleplaying Rules of 1989, Best Roleplaying Game of 2000 and Best Role Playing Game and Best Role Playing Supplement of 2014 for the flagship editions of the game. Both Dungeons & Dragons and Advanced Dungeons & Dragons are Origins Hall of Fame Games inductees as they were deemed sufficiently distinct to merit separate inclusion on different occasions.Academy of Adventure Gaming Arts and Design; Hall of Fame The independent Games magazine placed Dungeons & Dragons on their Games 100 list from 1980 through 1983, then entered the game into the magazine's Hall of Fame in 1984.Games Magazine Online; Hall of Fame Games magazine included Dungeons & Dragons in their "Top 100 Games of 1980", saying "The more players, the merrier." Advanced Dungeons & Dragons was ranked 2nd in the 1996 reader poll of Arcane magazine to determine the 50 most popular roleplaying games of all time. Dungeons & Dragons was inducted into the National Toy Hall of Fame in 2016 and into the Science Fiction and Fantasy Hall of Fame in 2017.

 Legacy and influence 

Dungeons & Dragons was the first modern role-playing game and it established many of the conventions that have dominated the genre. Particularly notable are the use of dice as a game mechanic, character record sheets, use of numerical attributes and gamemaster-centered group dynamics. Within months of Dungeons & Dragons'''s release, new role-playing game writers and publishers began releasing their own role-playing games, with most of these being in the fantasy genre. Some of the earliest other role-playing games inspired by D&D include Tunnels & Trolls (1975), Empire of the Petal Throne (1975), and Chivalry & Sorcery (1976). The game's commercial success was a factor that led to lawsuits regarding distribution of royalties between original creators Gygax and Arneson.Rausch; Dave Arneson Interview Gygax later became embroiled in a political struggle for control of TSR which culminated in a court battle and Gygax's decision to sell his ownership interest in the company in 1985.

The role-playing movement initiated by D&D would lead to release of the science fiction game Traveller (1977), the fantasy game RuneQuest (1978), and subsequent game systems such as Chaosium's Call of Cthulhu (1981), Champions (1982), GURPS (1986), and Vampire: The Masquerade (1991).Darlington; A History of Role-Playing Part VIII Dungeons & Dragons and the games it influenced fed back into the genre's origin – miniatures wargames – with combat strategy games like Warhammer Fantasy Battles. D&D also had a large impact on modern video games.

Director Jon Favreau credits Dungeons & Dragons with giving him "... a really strong background in imagination, storytelling, understanding how to create tone and a sense of balance." ND Stevenson and the crew of She-Ra and the Princesses of Power were strongly influenced by Dungeons & Dragons, with Stevenson calling it basically a D&D campaign, with Adora, Glimmer, and Bow falling into "specific classes in D&D".

History of criticism

At various times in its history, Dungeons & Dragons has received negative publicity, in particular from some Christian groups, for alleged promotion of such practices as devil worship, witchcraft, suicide, and murder, and for the presence of naked breasts in drawings of female humanoids in the original AD&D manuals (mainly monsters such as harpies, succubi, etc.). These controversies led TSR to remove many potentially controversial references and artwork when releasing the 2nd Edition of AD&D. Many of these references, including the use of the names "devils" and "demons", were reintroduced in the 3rd edition. The moral panic over the game led to problems for fans of D&D who faced social ostracism, unfair treatment, and false association with the occult and Satanism, regardless of an individual fan's actual religious affiliation and beliefs. However, the controversy was also beneficial in evoking the Streisand Effect by giving the game widespread notoriety that significantly increased sales in the early 1980s in defiance of the moral panic.Dungeons & Dragons has been the subject of rumors regarding players having difficulty separating fantasy from reality, even leading to psychotic episodes. The most notable of these was the saga of James Dallas Egbert III, the facts of which were fictionalized in the novel Mazes and Monsters and later made into a TV movie in 1982 starring Tom Hanks. William Dear, the private investigator hired by the Egbert family to find their son when he went missing at college, wrote a book titled The Dungeon Master refuting any connection with D&D and Egbert's personal issues. The game was blamed for some of the actions of Chris Pritchard, who was convicted in 1990 of murdering his stepfather. Research by various psychologists, starting with Armando Simon, has concluded that no harmful effects are related to the playing of D&D. Dungeons & Dragons has also been cited as encouraging people to socialize weekly or biweekly, teaching problem solving skills which can be beneficial in adult life, and teaching positive moral decisions.D&D has been compared unfavorably to other role-playing games of its time. Writing for Slate in 2008, Erik Sofge makes unfavorable comparisons between the violent incentives of D&D and the more versatile role-playing experience of GURPS. He claims that "for decades, gamers have argued that since D&D came first, its lame, morally repulsive experience system can be forgiven. But the damage is still being done: New generations of players are introduced to RPGs as little more than a collective fantasy of massacre." This criticism generated backlash from D&D fans. Writing for Ars Technica, Ben Kuchera responded that Sofge had experienced a "small-minded Dungeon Master who only wanted to kill things", and that better game experiences are possible.

In 2020, Polygon reported that "the D&D team announced that it would be making changes to portions of its 5th edition product line that fans have called out for being insensitive". Sebastian Modak, for The Washington Post, reported that the tabletop community has widely approved these changes. Modak wrote that "in its statement addressing mistakes around portrayals of different peoples in the D&D universe, Wizards of the Coast highlighted its recent efforts in bringing in more diverse voices to craft the new D&D source books coming out in 2021. [...] These conversations—around depictions of race and alleged treatment of employees of marginalized backgrounds and identities—have encouraged players to seek out other tabletop roleplaying experiences". Matthew Gault, for Wired, reported positively on the roundtable discussions Wizards of the Coast has hosted with fans and community leaders on diversity and inclusion. However, Gault also highlighted that other efforts, such as revisions to old material and the release of new material, have been less great and at times minimal. Gault wrote, "WotC appears to be trying to change things, but it keeps stumbling, and it's often the fans who pick up the pieces. [...] WotC is trying to make changes, but it often feels like lip service. [...] The loudest voices criticizing D&D right now are doing it out of love. They don't want to see it destroyed, they want it to change with the times". However, in 2022, academic Christopher Ferguson stated that the game "was not associated with greater ethnocentrism (one facet of racism) attitudes" after he conducted a survey study of 308 adults (38.2% non-White, and 17% Dungeons and Dragons players). Ferguson concluded that Wizards of the Coast may be responding to a moral panic similar to that surrounding Satanism in the 1990s.

In January 2023, ICv2 commented that the leaked OGL has several controversial parts including prohibiting "commercial publication for virtual tabletop platforms" and that while it "grants ownership of the OGL works to their creator" it also "gives WotC the perpetual, irrevocable right to use their works in any way it sees fit without payment". In the days following the leak, IGN, Vice, The Guardian, Financial Times CNBC, and many other industry focused outlets reported on negative reactions from both fans and professional content creators. ComicBook.com reported that it had "spoken with over 20 small to mid-sized creators who have said that in-progress projects set to be published under the OGL have been placed on hold due to" the terms in the leak. Many designers had also reported considering switching role-playing game systems entirely. Starburst commented that "historically when the owners of Dungeons and Dragons attempt to restrict what people can do with the game, it leads to a boom in other tabletop roleplaying games. This is happening right now". Both Kobold Press and MCDM Productions announced upcoming new tabletop RPG systems with both stating their respective systems would be open games. Paizo also announced a new Open RPG Creative License (ORC), a system-agnostic license, as a direct response to the reported changes to the OGL. Additional publishers, such as Kobold Press, Chaosium, Green Ronin, Legendary Games, and Rogue Genius Games, will be part of the ORC development process.

Following Wizards' response of walking back changes to the OGL, TheStreet commented that Wizards united its "entire player base" behind the movement "to restore the game's original open gaming license" with players responding "with their wallets"; "subscription service D&D Beyond saw players canceling subscriptions en masse – enough to allegedly cause the website to crash". TheStreet highlighted that in the time it took Wizards to settle on a response "that could quell the ire of its audience, the company's main competitors banded together to fill a need in the industry that D&D was hoping to cement shut". Io9 also highlighted that the movement to boycott D&D Beyond "sent a message to WotC and Hasbro higher-ups. According to multiple sources, these immediate financial consequences were the main thing that forced them to respond"; per sources, there were "'five digits' worth of complaining tickets in the system" for customer service to handle account deletion requests. Io9 reported that Wizards' internal messaging on the response to leak was this was a fan overreaction and "that in a few months, nobody will remember the uproar". Edwin Evans-Thirlwell, for The Washington Post, wrote that "pushback from fans, who criticized WotC’s response as far from an apology and a dismissal of their legitimate concerns, led WotC to backpedal further. A second bulletin [on January 18] included more details about the path forward". Evans-Thirlwell highlighted the release of the proposed OGL 1.2 with an open comment period, however, "some say the damage is already done. [...] Whether you view the original OGL as a mystic talisman or smoke-and-mirrors, WotC appears to have committed an irreversible act of self-sabotage in trying to replace it — squandering the prestige accumulated over 20 years in a matter of weeks". Both Io9 and ComicBook.com called the major concessions – releasing the SRD 5.1 under the creative commons and no longer deauthorizing the OGL1.0a – announced by Wizards on January 27, 2023 a "huge victory" for the Dungeons & Dragons community.

Related productsD&Ds commercial success has led to many other related products, including Dragon and Dungeon magazines, an animated television series, a film series, an official role-playing soundtrack, novels, both ongoing and limited series licensed comics, and numerous computer and video games. Hobby and toy stores sell dice, miniatures, adventures, and other game aids related to D&D and its game offspring.

In popular cultureD&D grew in popularity through the late 1970s and 1980s. Numerous games, films, and cultural references based on D&D or D&D-like fantasies, characters or adventures have been ubiquitous since the end of the 1970s. D&D players are (sometimes pejoratively) portrayed as the epitome of geekdom, and have become the basis of much geek and gamer humor and satire. "In 2017, 9 million people watched others play D&D on Twitch, immersing themselves in the world of the game without ever having to pick up a die or cast a spell". Since the release of 5th edition, these D&D shows have only grown in popularity. Critical Role, one of the most popular D&D shows, brings in an average of 21,978 viewers per week.  The Adventure Zone maintains roughly 640,000 listeners. Dimension 20 holds nearly 554,000 subscribers with an average view count of 111,333 on YouTube which is only a secondary source of their content.

Famous D&D players include Pulitzer Prize-winning author Junot Díaz, professional basketball player Tim Duncan, comedian Stephen Colbert, and actors Vin Diesel and Robin Williams.Diesel, Colbert, Lillard: Tonjes; Interview with Charles Ryan on the 2005 Worldwide Dungeons & Dragons Game DayBriggs; Duncan's unusual hobby and more unusual request D&D and its fans have been the subject of spoof films, including The Gamers: Dorkness Rising.

See also

 D&D Championship Series

Notes

References

 
 
 
  Archived copy of the article, taken 2009-07-13, page 2
 
 
 
 
 
 
 
 
 
 
 
 
 
 
 
 
 
 
 
 
 
 
 
 
 
 
 
 
 
 
 
 
 
 
 
 
 
 
 
 
 
 
 
 
 
 
 
 
 
 
 
 
 
 
 
 
 
 
 
 
 
 
 
 
 
 
 
 
 
 
 
 
 
 
 
 
 

Unknown author

  – select year on right of page.
 
 
 
 
 
 
 
 
 
 
 
 
 
 
 

Further reading

 
 
  An essay on the early history of the D&D hobby.
  Includes a suggested reading list on pages 255–256.
 Fannon, Sean Patrick. The Fantasy Roleplaying Gamer's Bible, 2nd Edition. Obsidian Studios, 1999. 
 
 
 Gygax, Gary. Roleplaying Mastery. New York: Perigee, 1987. .
 Gygax, Gary. Master of the Game. New York: Perigee, 1989. .
 Miller, John J. "I Was a Teenage Half-Orc", National Review Online, October 15, 2004.
 Miller, John J. "Dungeons & Dragons In a Digital World", The Wall Street Journal, July 1, 2008.
 
 
 Peterson, Jon. Playing at the World: A History of Simulating Wars, People and Fantastic Adventures, from Chess to Role-Playing Games. San Diego: Unreason, 2012. .
 
 
  An article about the conflict over the proprietary or open-source nature of Dungeons & Dragons''.
 Studies about fantasy roleplaying games – a list of academic articles about RPGs
 Gamespy's 30th Anniversary of Dungeons & Dragons special

External links

 
 
 

 
American role-playing games
Games adapted for other media
Hasbro franchises
Nerd culture
Origins Award winners
Role-playing games introduced in 1974
Tabletop games
Wizards of the Coast games